Maroon 5 (formerly Kara's Flowers) is an American pop rock band that originated in Los Angeles, California. This is the list of Maroon 5's videography.

Music videos

As lead artist

Guest appearances

Video albums 
 Live – Friday the 13th (2005)

Films and television 

 Palm Trees & Power Lines (2010)
 Sugar (2018)
 The Voice (2011, 2012, 2013, 2014, 2015, 2016, 2017, 2018, 2021)
 Victoria's Secret Swim Special (2015)
 Conan
 Saturday Night Live (?, 2011, 2012)
 American Idol
 Beverly Hills, 90210 (as Kara's Flowers) (1997)
 CSI: NY (2008)
 Good Morning America
 Room Raiders (2004)
 Top Chef Masters (2011)
 The Sauce (2007)
 The View (2007)
 The Ellen DeGeneres Show
  The Today Show (2003, 2004, 2005, 2007, 2010, 2011, 2012, 2013, 2014, 2017)
  Grammy Awards (2005, 2006, 2008)
  World Music Awards
  American Music Awards (2011)
 iHeartRadio Album Release Party (2014–2021)
 Nickelodeon Kids' Choice Awards (2007)
Last Call with Carson Daly
Late Late Show with Craig Kilborn
 Late Show with David Letterman
 The Late Show with Stephen Colbert
Jimmy Kimmel Live
 The Tonight Show Starring Jimmy Fallon
 The Tonight Show with Jay Leno
 CMT Crossroads (2008) (Maroon 5 with Sara Evans)
 FNMTV
 MTV Video Music Awards (2014) 
 People Magazine Awards (2014). 
 MTV TRL
 VH1's Top 20 Countdown (Interviews/Hosting)
 Daily Download
Billboard Music Awards (2004, 2011, ?)
 Inside Track Live
 MTV ET
MTV Hard Rock Live
MTV Europe Awards
VH1 Big In Awards (2004)
Jingle Ball Rock
 Kids' Choice Awards (2007).
Carson Daly New Years Special
Top Of The Pops
Diary Of
Tsunami Aid
E! (Red Carpet Interviews)
AFI Tribute to George Lucas
American Top 40
 Live 8
ReAct Now Benefit
 Unplugged (Adam Levine with Alicia Keys)
 ESPN Saturday Night Football
 NFL Kickoff
VH1 I Love The 80's
 VH1 I Love the 80's 3-D
VH1 I Love The 90's
Pepsi Smash
Rove Live
Today with Des and Mel
The Sharon Osbourne Show
The Orlando Jones Show
MTV Backstage Pass Week
MTV Cribs (Adam Levine, James Valentine) 
Extra
The Insider
TV Guide Channel
CNN Headline News
Mad TV

Canadian Idol (2007) 

Gaon Chart Awards (2012, 2013, 2017)
MTV Maroon 5 Special(Making the Video + MTV Hits)
MTV World Stage Maroon 5
Mnet M Story - 마성의 보컬 애덤 리바인
 MBC News  (2014)
 SBS News (2014, 2015)
JTBC News (2015)
 YTN News (2005, 2014)
OBS (2015)
TBC (2015)

Live @ Home (2010)
Le Grand Journal (2012)
C à vous (2014)

 CD:UK 
 The Michael Ball Show (2010)
 Live from Studio Five (2010)
 The National Lottery Draws (2010)
 The Voice UK (2012)
 The Graham Norton Show (2014)
 Sunday Night at the Palladium (2014)
 The X Factor (2014)
 Alan Carr: Chatty Man (2015)

 Music Station
 Sukkiri!! (2014)
 SMAP×SMAP (2014)

 Guinness World Records – Die größten Weltrekorde (2007)
 Germany's Next Top Model (2012)
 Schlag den Raab (2014)

Commercials

Appearance 
 Worldwide – Hyundai Motors (2018–present)
  – JBL (2011–present)
  – Snapple (2011)
  – Nissan (2014)

Music 
  – The CW (2008)
  – Toyota
  – JBL (2011–present)
  – GM Chevrolet Malibu (2012)
 Worldwide – Samsung Galaxy Note series (2011–2012)
  – Hyundai Motors Sonata Hybrid (2013)
  – Kia Motors Soul (2014)
  – Nissan (2014)
  – Shinhan Card  (2015)
  – Toyota Corolla Altis (2015–2016)
  – Audi Q7 (2016)

References

External links 
 
 
 

Videography
Videographies of American artists
American filmographies